Lahore Lions (Punjabi: لہور لائنز abbreviated as LIO) was a Pakistani franchise cricket team representing the city Lahore and was one of the 19 domestic teams. The team was established by Lahore Regional Cricket Association in 2004/05 in its home ground Lahore City Cricket Association Ground. Domestically, the team played in the Haier T20 Cup. The team won its first title in 2010 where they defeated Karachi Dolphins by 37 runs in their home ground, Gaddafi Stadium.

History
Lahore Lions are the most successful Twenty20 team in the history of the Lahore Regional Cricket Association, and the second most successful in the country after the Sialkot Stallions. The team won the T20 Cup 2010/11 under the captaincy of Shoaib Iqbal Joiya and qualified for the inaugural Super-8 T20 Cup. Lahore Lions won the 2013–14 season and qualified for the Champions League T20.

Current squad

Former notable players 
 Muhammad Yousuf
 Abdul Razzaq
 Imran Farhat (Now, plays for Lahore Eagles)
 Imran Tahir (Now, plays for Highveld Lions, South Africa)
 Salman Butt
 Kamran Akmal (Plays Sometimes for Lahore Eagles and sometimes for Lahore Lions)
 Azhar Ali (Plays Sometimes for Lahore Eagles and sometimes for Lahore Lions)
 Taufeeq Umar (Now, plays for Lahore Eagles)

Honours

 DNQ = Did Not Qualify

Fixtures and results

T20 results

By Opposition

CLT20 2014 season

Lahore Lions qualified first time for the Champions League Twenty20, becoming the third Pakistani team overall to participate in the tournament since its inception. Abdul Razzaq was not included in the squad as Pakistan Cricket Board rejected Muhammad Hafeez's request to add him. The squad contained the following players:
Mohammed Hafeez(c), Ahmad Shahzad, Umar Siddique Khan, Muhammad Umar Akmal, Nasir Jamshaid, Muhammad Salman Ali, Asif Raza, Muhammad Mustafa Iqbal, Wahab Riaz, Aizaz Bin Ilyas Cheema, Imran Ali, Saad Naseem, Adnan Rasool, Muhammad Saeed and Ali Manzoor. 
The team defeated 2013 Champions Mumbai Indians and Southern Express of Sri Lanka to qualify for the main event. After a washout in their game against Chennai Super Kings, they defeated Dolphins of South Africa. But Lahore Lions played their last match against Perth Scorchers and lost it match which made them out of tournament. The captain Muhammad Hafeez was satisfied with the team for their exceptional performance in the event, he said: "I think our team’s performance in the face of limited resources was remarkable. Unlike other big teams, we didn’t have batting, bowling or fielding coaches with us, but we still managed to fight well. We learned a lot from the CLT20 and it’s great for young domestic players to come and perform at such a big stage.”
PCB decided to hold the domestic T20 competition in Pakistan on the same dates as the Champions League. This meant that a second Lahore Lions team played in the Pakistani tournament and the main team played in the Champions League 2014. The second XI were defeated in the finals of the domestic competition by Peshawar Panthers.

Captains' record
List of captains of Lahore Lions for Twenty20 matches are as follows:

Sponsors 
FR Cables was the sponsor of the Lahore Lions in 2010-11 Faysal Bank Twenty-20 Cup and were sponsored by FR Cables for the Faysal Bank Super 8 T20 Cup 2011 as well. Brighto Paints were the sponsors of Lions in 2014 Champions League Twenty20.

See also
 Pakistan Super League

References

External links
Lahore Lions on ESPN Cricinfo

National Twenty20 Cup teams
Cricket clubs established in 2004
2004 establishments in Pakistan
Cricket teams in Pakistan
Lions